Mahmoud Hussein (born 12 December 1966) is an Egyptian journalist for Al Jazeera. He was held in an Egyptian prison for four years, without being charged or going through trial, until his release on 6 February 2021. His incarceration was in violation of Egyptian law and was condemned by international rights groups, media freedom organisations and the United Nations.

Career
Hussein was born on 12 December 1966 in the Giza Governorate village of Zawiyat Abo Musallam. He attended Cairo University and graduated with two degrees in political science and law.

Hussein began his journalism career as a politics editor and then broadcaster for the Voice of the Arabs radio station in Cairo. He joined the state-run Nile TV in 1997 as a political affairs correspondent before a promotion to the channel's head of correspondents. Hussein worked with several Arabic news channels and became Cairo's bureau chief of Sudan TV. He taught news production and editing at the Radio and Television Institute in Cairo.

Hussein joined Al Jazeera's Cairo bureau as a correspondent in 2010 after serving as a freelancer for the network. When the Egyptian authorities closed Al Jazeera's Cairo office in 2013, he moved to Al Jazeera's headquarters in Doha to work as a news producer.

Arrest and imprisonment
On 20 December 2016, Hussein was arrested shortly after his arrival in Egypt while on a visit to see his family. He was questioned for 14 hours without a lawyer present and then released. Hussein was arrested for a second time on 23 December 2016 but it was not announced by Egyptian authorities until two days later. Hussein was accused of "incitement against state institutions and broadcasting false news with the aim of spreading chaos"; the charges were denied by Hussein and the Al Jazeera Media Network (AJMN). Egyptian media circulated information that detailed Hussein as a terrorist and an enemy of the state.

Hussein was held in the maximum-security Tora Prison where he experienced physical and psychological duress. He was kept in solitary confinement for the first three months after his arrest, where he suffered a broken arm and was refused proper medical treatment.

In May 2019, an Egyptian court rejected an order by the state prosecutor to release Hussein. Authorities instead returned Hussein to prison and opened a new investigation into him with unspecified charges. Hussein requested to visit his critically ill father in hospital before the latter's death in November 2019 but was rejected by the prison warden.

The Egyptian penal code sets a maximum pre-trial detention period of 620 days for individuals who are investigated for a felony. Hussein reached 1,000 days of illegal detention in September 2019. Hussein shared a cell with three other inmates. He was allowed to have visitors once a week, where his family observed his substantial weight loss and developed concerns for his health.

Calls for release
The Al Jazeera Media Network (AJMN) consistently denied the charges placed against Hussein and called for his release. Mostefa Souag, the Acting Director General of AJMN, has called Hussein's case as "baseless accusations and trumped-up charges." On the 1,000th day of his illegal detention, Al Jazeera launched a campaign website at FreeMahmoudHussein.com.

On 3 February 2018, the Office of the United Nations High Commissioner for Human Rights (OHCHR) deemed the detention of Hussein as "arbitrary" and demanded his immediate release. The OHCHR report concluded there was "no legal basis in Egyptian law" for Hussein's continued pre-trial detention and drew attention to Egyptian authorities' failure to produce justifiable evidence.

The International Press Institute and Amman Center for Human Rights Studies called for Hussein's release. His case has been detailed by the Tom Lantos Human Rights Commission.

On 6 February 2021 Hussein was released from prison.

See also
2013–15 detention of Al Jazeera journalists by Egypt

References

1966 births
Living people
Al Jazeera people
Cairo University alumni
Egyptian journalists
Imprisoned journalists
People from Giza Governorate
Prisoners and detainees of Egypt